Huimin bao is a socio-political newspaper published in Bishkek, Kyrgyzstan. Named after the Hui people, it is the world's only Dungan language newspaper.

In 2014 the Kyrgyz Hui Muslim Association and the China News Agency Xinjiang Branch cooperated to increase the Chinese version of Huimin bao. In the same year, the Chinese decided to rename the newspaper as Zhongya Huimin bao (Central Asian Hui Newspaper;) due to the fact that Dungan people (part of the Hui ancestry) are spread throughout Central Asia.

Newspapers are circulated once a month to 3,000 copies. In the 1970s, Huimin bao published 4,400 copies twice a week.

History
In 1930, the newspaper was first known in Kyrgyz as Sabattuu bol ('Be Literate') and was written in the Kirghiz ASSR. Dungan writers Yasir Shiwazi and Husein Makeyev started working on the newspaper. In January 1932, it was published in Dungan as Dong Huexir ('Spark of the East') in the capital city of what was formerly known as Frunze. It held its name before the newspaper ceased publications in 1939. When the Soviet Dungan newspaper resumed publication in 1957, it was renamed the Sulian huizu bao ('Soviet Hui Newspaper') while Shiwazi was appointed its editor-in-chief, holding that post until his retirement in 1965. In 1958, Shiwazi then renamed the newspaper to the Shiyuedi qi ('October Banner'), and during this time, the newspaper appeared twice a month with circulation to about 4,400 copies every two weeks. During the collapse of the Soviet Union in the early 1990s, the newspaper was renamed once again to Huimin bao and the circulation was changed to monthly with about 3,000 copies today.

References

Newspapers published in Kyrgyzstan
Newspapers published in the Soviet Union
Mass media in Bishkek
Publications established in 1932
1985 establishments in China